The 1832 United Kingdom general election in Ireland saw the emergence of the Repeal Association as a major political movement in Ireland. The Association, led by Daniel O'Connell, aimed to repeal the 1800 Acts of Union and restore Ireland to the status enjoyed after the reforms of 1782, while maintaining Catholic emancipation.

This was the first election following the Representation of the People (Ireland) Act 1832 and the Parliamentary Boundaries (Ireland) Act 1832, which saw an increase in the Irish representation from 100 to 105 MPs.

Results

See also
 History of Ireland (1801–1923)

1832
1832 in Ireland
Ireland
December 1832 events
January 1833 events
1830s elections in Ireland